Mai Volfovich Dantsig (April 27, 1930 – March 26, 2017) was a Belarusian artist active during the Soviet era and independence of Belarus. He is considered to  have been one of the founders of the contemporary Belarusian art.

Education and career

Dantzig was born in Minsk, Belarus. He graduated from the Minsk Arts College in 1952 and the Surikov Arts Institute in Moscow in 1958. In Moscow he studied under Mikhail Kurilko and Victor Tsyplakov.

From 1958, he taught at the Belarusian Academy of Arts. From 2001 until his death in 2017, he was the chairman of the Department of Painting there. In 1995, he became a People's Artist of Belarus. In 2005, he was awarded the Order of Francysk Skaryna.

Paintings

Mai Dantsig often painted in large formats, which, in addition to his expressive style, helped transform his chosen themes from quotidian to important, and imbued his pictures with a monumental character. His works often take on symbolic or metaphorical significance.

He is the author of many paintings and drawings related to World War II and Soviet partisans including the And the Saved World Remembers. He is also famous for his series of portraits of Soviet intelligentsia including Bulat Okudzhava, Georgy Tovstonogov, Ales Adamovich and Vasil Bykaŭ.

Death
Dantsig died on March 26, 2017, in Minsk from natural causes, at the age of 86.

References

External links
Interview with Mai Dantsig in the newspaper Vecherny Minsk May 10, 2005 
Dantsig in Chagal museum 

1930 births
2017 deaths
20th-century Belarusian Jews
21st-century Belarusian Jews
Belarusian painters
Soviet painters
Artists from Minsk
People's Artists of Belarus